Antoni Wiwulski (20 February 1877 – 10 January 1919) was a Polish-Lithuanian architect and sculptor.

Biography
He was born 20 February 1877 in Totma, in Russia, where his father Antoni, veteran of the January Uprising of 1863, served as a forest superintendent. Both parent were born in Samogitia, his mother Adelajda Karpuszko was able to speak in Samogitian. Antoni Wiwulski graduated from the German gymnasium in Mitau, and later from the reputable Jesuit boarding school in Khyriv. There he met Jan Beyzym, who developed in him a passion for carving. He graduated in 1897 and then two of the most prestigious art and architecture universities of the epoch: the École Supérieure des Beaux-Arts in Paris and the Higher Technical School in Vienna. In Paris he met  and, through this acquaintance, Ignacy Paderewski. In July 1908 he stayed at Paderewski's residence in Morges, Switzerland, where the idea of creating a monument commemorating the 500th anniversary of the Battle of Grunwald was born. His work was part of the sculpture event in the art competition at the 1912 Summer Olympics.

Among the most notable of his works are:
 the Grunwald Monument in Kraków, Poland (1910)
 Chapel in Šiluva, Lithuania (1912-1924)
 Three Crosses on the Hill of the Three Crosses Vilnius, Lithuania (1916)

The Holy Heart of Jesus' Church was started in 1913 and was the first monumental building created with usage of reinforced concrete in the former Polish–Lithuanian Commonwealth. Wiwulski, impressed by the possibility of building gigantic buildings with the newly rediscovered material prepared a project of a giant church with a stylised gigantic sculpture of the Creator sitting on the dome. However, the project was discontinued after Wiwulski's death on 10 January 1919.

In 1919, despite suffering from tuberculosis, he volunteered for the Polish militia (Self-Defence of Lithuania and Belarus) and took part in the defence of Vilnius against Bolshevik assault in the early stages of the Polish-Bolshevik War campaigns. He contracted pneumonia while on guard in the Vilnius' suburb of Užupis. After his death he was buried in the cellars beneath the church he had designed. When it was converted by the Soviets into a Palace of the Construction Workers in 1964 his ashes were moved to Rasos Cemetery.

Gallery

See also
 List of Polish sculptors
 List of Poles

References

Bibliography

 
 

1877 births
1919 deaths
People from Vologda Oblast
People from Totemsky Uyezd
20th-century sculptors
Lithuanian architects
Lithuanian sculptors
20th-century Polish architects
Polish sculptors
Polish male sculptors
TU Wien alumni
Olympic competitors in art competitions
Burials at Rasos Cemetery
Deaths from pneumonia in Poland